KBWG may refer to:

 the ICAO code for Bowling Green-Warren County Regional Airport
 KBWG-LP, a low-power radio station (107.5 FM) licensed to Browning, Montana, United States